This is a list of Latvian football transfers in the 2015 summer transfer window by club. Only transfers of the Virslīga are included.

All transfers mentioned are shown in the references at the bottom of the page. If you wish to insert a transfer that isn't mentioned there, please add a reference.

Latvian Higher League

Ventspils 

In:

 

Out:

Skonto 

In:

 

  

  

Out:

Jelgava 

In:

 
 

Out:

Liepāja 

In:

 

Out:

Spartaks 

In:

Out:

BFC Daugavpils 

In:

 

Out:

METTA/LU 

In:

 

Out:

Gulbene  

In:

Out:

References

External links 
 lff.lv 
 sportacentrs.com 

2015
Latvia
Football
tansfers